The 2015 Aegon Eastbourne Trophy was a professional tennis tournament played on outdoor grass courts. It was the first edition of the tournament and part of the 2015 ITF Women's Circuit, offering a total of $50,000 in prize money. It took place in Eastbourne, United Kingdom, on 1–7 June 2015.

Singles main draw entrants

Seeds 

 1 Rankings as of 25 May 2015

Other entrants 
The following players received wildcards into the singles main draw:
  Naomi Cavaday
  Harriet Dart
  Francesca Stephenson
  Emily Webley-Smith

The following players received entry from the qualifying draw:
  Alison Bai
  Eleni Daniilidou
  Georgina García Pérez
  Tara Moore

Champions

Singles

 Anett Kontaveit def.  Alla Kudryavtseva, 7–6(7–4), 7–6(7–2)

Doubles

 Shelby Rogers /  Coco Vandeweghe def.  Jocelyn Rae /  Anna Smith, 7–5, 7–6(7–1)

External links 
 2015 Aegon Eastbourne Trophy at ITFtennis.com
 Official website

Aegon Eastbourne Trophy
2015
Aegon Eastbourne Trophy
Aegon Eastbourne Trophy
2015 in English tennis